Jalen Hawkins (born January 24, 2001) is a professional soccer player who plays as a forward for FC Ingolstadt 04. Born in Germany, Hawkins has represented the United States at youth international level.

Career 
After playing in the academies of Bayern Munich and FC Ingolstadt 04, Hawkins made his professional debut for Ingolstadt on June 16, 2021, coming on as a substitute in a 0–0 draw vs. Eintracht Braunschweig.

On January 31, 2022, Hawkins joined 1. FC Saarbrücken on loan until the end of the season.

Career statistics

Notes

References

2001 births
Living people
German footballers
German people of African-American descent
Citizens of the United States through descent
American soccer players
African-American soccer players
Association football forwards
United States men's youth international soccer players
FC Ingolstadt 04 players
FC Bayern Munich footballers
1. FC Saarbrücken players
2. Bundesliga players
3. Liga players